A Family for Joe is an American sitcom that starred Robert Mitchum in the title role. It started out as a television movie that aired NBC on February 25, 1990, before turning it into a series that lasted from March 24 until August 19, 1990. Nine episodes of the series were filmed.

Plot
A Family for Joe is about the Bankston children, 15-year-old Holly (Juliette Lewis), 16-year-old Nick (David Lascher), 9-year-old Chris (Ben Savage), and 7-year-old Mary (Jessica Player) who have been recently orphaned. Rather than have themselves split up into foster care, they find a homeless man, Joe (Robert Mitchum), to live with them and act as their grandfather.

Cast
Robert Mitchum as Joe Whitaker
Juliette Lewis as Holly Bankston
David Lascher as Nick Bankston
Barry Gordon as Roger Hightower
Ben Savage as Chris Bankston
Jessica Player as Mary Bankston
Barbara Babcock as Miss Collins
David Nelson as George Merkel
Anna Mathias as Annie Brewster
Jim Hackett as Pete Brewster 
Janet MacLachlan as Judge Delaney
Patrick Cronin as Mr. Reed
Robert Casper as Mr. Edwards
Richard X. Slattery as Officer Finney
Maggie Egan as Mrs. Lewis
John Mitchum as Preacher
Helena Carroll as Mrs. Spruce
Beverly Sanders as Doctor Bennett
Patrick Campbell as Homeless Man
Dorothy Neumann as Bag Lady
Dennis Fimple as Man at Mission Door
Dartanian as Punk 1
Andrew Roperto as Punk 2
Hugo Huizar as Punk 3
Andrew Margolin as Young Cop
Diane Almeida as Nurse
Julie Ashton as Bank Cashier
Sam Denoff as Slamburger Manager
Nikki Cox as Carrie Lewis
Gretchen Learman as Valerie Brewster
Jacqueline Caru as Bonnie Brewster
Justin Shenkarow as Pete Brewster Jr.
Brandon Loomis as Student / BoyScout
Jorga Caye as AA Meeting Attendee

Episodes

TV Movie

Episodes

Response
Ken Tucker of Entertainment Weekly rated the series a D, stating that "the kids are leering little creeps, the jokes are moronic, and Joe's homelessness is already absent from the show's current scripts".

In the documentary series The Write Environment, writer Philip Rosenthal (who would go on to create Everybody Loves Raymond) talks about being a staff writer on the series.

References

External links

1990s American sitcoms
1990 American television series debuts
1990 American television series endings
NBC original programming
Television series about families
English-language television shows
Television series by Universal Television
Television shows set in Los Angeles